Leopold von Ranke (21 December 1795 – 23 May 1886) was a German historian and a founder of modern source-based history. He was able to implement the seminar teaching method in his classroom and focused on archival research and the analysis of historical documents. Building on the methods of the Göttingen School of History, he was the first to establish a historical seminar. Ranke set the standards for much of later historical writing, introducing such ideas as reliance on primary sources (empiricism), an emphasis on narrative history and especially international politics (Außenpolitik). He was ennobled in 1865, with the addition of a "von" to his name.

Ranke also had a great influence on Western historiography and is considered a symbol of the quality of 19th century German historical studies. Ranke, influenced by Barthold Georg Niebuhr, was very talented in constructing narratives without exceeding the limits of historical evidence. His critics have noted the influence of Lutheranism in guiding his work, especially his belief that God's actions were manifest in the lives of men and history, a viewpoint that shaped his ideas that the German Empire was a manifestation of God's intent.

Early life 
Ranke was born in Wiehe, Thuringia, Saxony. Wiehe was then a part of the Electorate of Saxony. He came from a family of Lutheran pastors and lawyers. He was educated partly at home and partly in the high school at Schulpforta. His early years engendered a lifelong love of Ancient Greek, Latin and Lutheranism. In 1814, Ranke entered the University of Leipzig, where his subjects were Classics and Lutheran theology. At Leipzig, Ranke became an expert in philology and translation of the ancient authors into German. His teachers included Johann Gottfried Jakob Hermann. As a student, Ranke's favorite authors were Thucydides, Livy, Dionysius of Halicarnassus, Johann Wolfgang von Goethe, Barthold Georg Niebuhr, Immanuel Kant, Johann Gottlieb Fichte, Friedrich Schelling and Friedrich Schlegel. Ranke showed little interest in the work of modern history because of his dissatisfaction with what he regarded as history books that were merely a collection of facts lumped together by modern historians.

Between 1817 and 1825, Ranke worked as a schoolmaster teaching classics at the Friedrichs Gymnasium in Frankfurt an der Oder. During this time, he became interested in history in part because of his desire to be involved in the developing field of a more professionalized history and in part because of his desire to find the hand of God in the workings of history.

Career 
In 1824, Ranke launched his career with the book Geschichten der romanischen und germanischen Völker von 1494 bis 1514 (Histories of the Latin and Teutonic Peoples from 1494 to 1514) in which he used an unusually wide variety of sources for a historian of the age, including "memoirs, diaries, personal and formal missives, government documents, diplomatic dispatches and first-hand accounts of eye-witnesses". In that sense, he leaned on the traditions of philology but emphasized mundane documents instead of old and exotic literature.

After the minister of education was impressed with the work of a historian who did not have access to the nation's great public libraries, Ranke was given a position in the University of Berlin, where he was a professor for nearly fifty years, starting in 1825. At the university, he used the seminar system and taught how to check the value of sources. Ranke became deeply involved in the dispute between the followers of the legal professor Friedrich Carl von Savigny, who emphasized the varieties of different periods of history, and the followers of the philosopher Georg Wilhelm Friedrich Hegel, who saw history as the unfolding of a universal story. Ranke supported Savigny and criticized the Hegelian view of history as being a one-size-fits-all approach. Also during his time in Berlin, Ranke became the first historian to use the forty-seven volumes that comprised the diplomatic archives of Venice from the 16th and 17th centuries. Since many archives opened up during this time, he sent out his students to these places to recruit information. In his classrooms, he would discuss the sources that his students would find and would emphasize that history should be told "the way it happened". Therefore, he is often seen as "the pioneer of a critical historical science". Meanwhile, Ranke came to prefer dealing with primary sources as opposed to secondary sources.

It was in Vienna where the friendship of Friedrich von Gentz and the protection of Klemens von Metternich opened to him the Venetian Archives, a fresh source, the value of which he first discovered; it is still not exhausted. He found time to write a short book entitled Die Serbische Revolution (1829) from material supplied to him by Vuk Karadžić, a Serb who had himself been witness to the scenes he related during the First Serbian Uprising in 1804. This was afterwards expanded into Serbien und die Turkei im 19 Jahrhundert (1879).

At the behest of the Prussian government, Ranke founded and edited the Historische-Politische Zeitschrift journal from 1832 to 1836. Ranke, who was a conservative, used the journal to attack the ideas of liberalism. In his 1833 article "The Great Powers" and his 1836 article "Dialogue on Politics", Ranke claimed that every state is given a special moral character from God and individuals should strive to best fulfill the "idea" of their state. Thus, in this way, Ranke urged his readers to stay loyal to the Prussian state and to reject the ideas of the French Revolution, which Ranke claimed were meant for France only.

From 1834 to 1836, Ranke published Die römischen Päpste, ihre Kirche und ihr Staat im sechzehnten und siebzehnten Jahrhundert (The Popes of Rome, Their Church and State in the Sixteenth and Seventeenth Centuries) (3 vols.). As a Protestant, Ranke was barred from viewing the Vatican archives in Rome, but on the basis of private papers in Rome and Venice he was able to explain the history of the papacy in the 16th century. In this book, Ranke coined the term "Counter-reformation" and offered colorful portrayals of Pope Paul IV, Ignatius of Loyola and Pope Pius V. He promoted research into primary sources: "I see the time approaching when we shall base modern history, no longer on the reports even of contemporary historians, except insofar as they were in the possession of personal and immediate knowledge of facts; and still less on work yet more remote from the source; but rather on the narratives of eyewitnesses, and on genuine and original documents".

The papacy denounced Ranke's book as anti-Catholic while many Protestants denounced it as not anti-Catholic enough, but he has been generally praised by historians for placing the situation of the Roman Catholic Church in the context of the 16th century and for his fair treatment of the complex interaction of the political and religious issues in that century. The British Roman Catholic historian Lord Acton defended Ranke's book as the most fair-minded, balanced and objective study ever written on the papacy of the 16th century.

In 1841, his fame in its ascendancy, Ranke was appointed Historiographer Royal to the Prussian court. In 1845, he became a member of the Royal Netherlands Academy of Arts and Sciences.

In Paris, Ranke met the Irish woman Clarissa Helena Graves (born 1808) from Dublin in July 1843. She had been educated in England and the Continent. They were engaged on 1 October and married in Bowness, England in a ceremony officiated by her brother Robert Perceval Graves, an Anglican priest.

From 1847 to 1848, Ranke published Neun Bücher preussicher Geschichte (translated as Memoirs of the House of Brandenburg and History of Prussia, during the Seventeenth and Eighteenth Centuries) in which he examined the fortunes of the Hohenzollern family and state from the Middle Ages to the reign of Frederick the Great. Many Prussian nationalists were offended by Ranke's portrayal of Prussia as a typical medium-sized German state rather than as a great power.  

From 1852 to 1861, Ranke published French History Mainly in the 16th and 17th Centuries (5 vols.), covering Francis I to Louis XIV and gaining him more praise for his impartiality despite being German.

In a series of lectures given before future King Maximilian II of Bavaria in 1854, Ranke argued that "every age is next to God", by which he meant that every period of history is unique and must be understood in its own context. He argued that God gazes over history in its totality and finds all periods equal. Ranke rejected the teleological approach to history, by which each period is considered inferior to the period which follows. Thus, the Middle Ages were not inferior to the Renaissance, simply different. In Ranke's view, the historian had to understand a period on its own terms and seek to find only the general ideas which animated every period of history. For Ranke, history was not to be an account of man's "progress" because "[a]fter Plato, there can be no more Plato". Ultimately, "[h]istory is no criminal court". 

For Ranke, Christianity was morally most superior and could not be improved upon. When he wrote Zur orientalischen Frage. Gutachten at the behest of the kaiser he framed the conflict with the Ottoman Empire as primarily religious in nature; the civil rights of Christians against Muslims in the Ottoman Empire could only be secured by the intervention of the Christian European nations.

From 1854 to 1857, Ranke published History of the Reformation in Germany (Deutsche Geschichte im Zeitalter der Reformation), using the ninety-six volumes of correspondence from ambassadors to the Imperial Diet he found in Frankfurt to explain the Reformation in Germany as the result of both politics and religion.

From 1859 to 1867, Ranke published the six-volume History of England Principally in the Sixteenth and Seventeenth Centuries (Englische Geschichte vornehmlich im XVI and XVII Jahrhundert), followed by an expanded nine-volume edition from 1870 to 1884, which extended his huge reach even farther. At this point, he was eighty years old, and devoted the rest of his career to shorter treatises on German history that supplement his earlier writings.

 Later life 

The honors poured in when Ranke was ennobled in 1865, appointed a Prussian Privy Councillor in 1882 and given an honorary citizenship of Berlin in 1885. In 1884, he was appointed the first honorary member of the American Historical Association. In 1885, he was elected as a member to the American Philosophical Society. After his retirement in 1871, Ranke continued to write on a variety of subjects relating to German history such as the French Revolutionary Wars, Albrecht von Wallenstein, Karl August von Hardenberg, and King Frederick William IV of Prussia. In 1880, Ranke began a huge six-volume work on world history which began with ancient Egypt and the Israelites. By the time of his death in Berlin in 1886 at the age of 90, Ranke had reached only the 12th century, but his assistants later used his notes to take the series up to 1453.
After his wife died in 1871, Ranke became half-blind, depending on assistants to read to him. A diary entry from January 1877 contains his mature thoughts about being a historian:

The proverb tells us that poets are born. Not only in the arts, but even in some scholarly fields, young men develop into full bloom, or at least display their originality. Musicians and mathematicians have the expectation of attaining eminence in early years. But a historian must be old, not only because of the immeasurable extent of his field of study, but because of the insight into the historical process which a long life confers, especially under changing conditions. It would hardly be bearable for him to have only a short span of experience. For his personal development requires that great events complete their course before his eyes, that others collapse, that new forms be attempted.

After Ranke's death, Syracuse University purchased his collection. The Ranke Library of 25,000 books and other materials was ten times as large as the university's own.

 Methodology and criticism 
At the core of his method, Ranke did not believe that general theories could cut across time and space. Instead, he made statements about the time using quotations from primary sources, saying: "My understanding of 'leading ideas' is simply that they are the dominant tendencies in each century. However, these tendencies can only be described; they can not, in the last resort, be summed up in a concept". Ranke objected to philosophy of history, particularly as practiced by Hegel, claiming that Hegel ignored the role of human agency in history which was too essential to be "characterized through only one idea or one word" or "circumscribed by a concept". This lack of emphasis on unifying theories or themes led Rudolf Haym to denigrate his ideas as "the mindlessness of the empiricist". In the 19th century, Ranke's work was very popular and his ideas about historical practice gradually became dominant in western historiography. However, he had critics among his contemporaries, including Karl Marx, a former Hegelian, who suggested that Ranke engaged in some of the practices he criticized in other historians.

Ranke began his first book with the statement in the introduction that he would show the unity of the experiences of the "Teutonic" nations of Scandinavia, England and Germany and the "Latin" nations of Italy, Spain and France through the great "respirations" of the Völkerwanderung (great migration), the Crusades and colonization that in Ranke's view bound all of the nations together to produce modern European civilization. Despite his opening statement, Ranke largely treated all of the nations under examination separately until the outbreak of the wars for the control of Italy starting in 1494. However, the book is best remembered for Ranke's comment: "To history has been assigned the office of judging the past, of instructing the present for the benefit of future ages. To such high offices this work does not aspire: It wants only to show what actually happened (wie es eigentlich gewesen ist)". Ranke's statement that history should embrace the principle of wie es eigentlich gewesen ist (meaning "how things actually were") was subsequently taken by many historians as their guiding principle. There has been much debate over the precise meaning of this phrase. Some have argued that adhering to the principle of wie es eigentlich gewesen ist means that the historian should document facts, but not offer any interpretation of these facts. Following Georg Iggers, Peter Novick has argued that Ranke, who was more of a romantic and idealist than his American contemporaries understood, meant instead that the historian should discover the facts and find the essences behind them. Under this view, the word eigentlich should be translated as "essentially", the aim then being to "show what essentially happened". Ranke went on to write that the historian must seek the "Holy hieroglyph" that is God's hand in history, keeping an "eye for the universal" whilst taking "pleasure in the particular".

While Ranke's methods remain influential in the practice of history, his broader ideas of historiography and empiricism are now regarded by some as outdated and no longer credible. They held sway among historians until the mid-20th century, when they were challenged by E. H. Carr and Fernand Braudel. Carr opposed Ranke's ideas of empiricism as naive, boring and outmoded, saying that historians did not merely report facts; they choose which facts they use. Braudel's approach was based on the histoire problème. Remarking on the legacy of Ranke's dictum that historians should represent the past wie es eigentlich gewesen ist ("as it actually happened"), Walter Benjamin scathingly wrote that it represented "the strongest narcotic of the [19th] century".

 Honours and awards 

 Selected works 
 Geschichten der romanischen und germanischen Völker von 1494 bis 1514 ("Histories of the Romanic and Germanic Peoples from 1494 to 1514", 1824)
 Serbische Revolution ("Serbian Revolution", 1829)
 Fürsten und Völker von Süd-Europa im sechzehnten und siebzehnten Jahrhundert ("Princes and Peoples of Southern Europe in the Sixteenth and Seventeenth Centuries")
 Die römischen Päpste in den letzten vier Jahrhunderten ("The Roman Popes in the Last Four Centuries", 1834–1836)
 Neun Bücher preussischer Geschichte (Memoirs of the House of Brandenburg and History of Prussia, during the Seventeenth and Eighteenth Centuries, 1847–1848)
 Französische Geschichte, vornehmlich im sechzehnten und siebzehnten Jahrhundert (Civil Wars and Monarchy in France, in the Sixteenth and Seventeenth Centuries: A History of France Principally During That Period, 1852–1861)
 Die deutschen Mächte und der Fürstenbund ("The German Powers and the Princes' League", 1871–1872)
 Ursprung und Beginn der Revolutionskriege 1791 und 1792 (Origin and Beginning of the Revolutionary Wars 1791 and 1792, 1875)
 Hardenberg und die Geschichte des preussischen Staates von 1793 bis 1813 (Hardenberg and the History of the Prussian State from 1793 to 1813, 1877)
 Weltgeschichte – Die Römische Republik und ihre Weltherrschaft (World history:  The Roman Republic and Its World Rule, 2 volumes, 1886)

 Works in English translation 
 The Ottoman and the Spanish Empires, in the Sixteenth and Seventeenth Centuries, Whittaker & Co., 1843.
 Memoirs of the House of Brandenburg and History of Prussia During the Seventeenth and Eighteenth Centuries, Vol. 2, Vol. 3, John Murray, 1849.
 Civil Wars and Monarchy in France, in the Sixteenth and Seventeenth Centuries, Richard Bentley, 1852.
 The History of Servia and the Servian Revolution, Henry G. Bohn, 1853.
 History of England Principally in the Seventeenth Century, Volume Two, Volume Three, Volume Four, Volume Five, Volume Six, Oxford: At the Clarendon Press, 1875.
 Universal History: The Oldest Historical Group of Nations and the Greeks, Charles Scribner's Sons, 1884.
 History of the Popes: Their Church and State,  Vol. 2, Vol. 3, P. F. Collier & Son, 1901. (Translated by Sarah Austin); first translation by Eliza Foster in 1847-48.
 History of the Reformation in Germany, George Routledge & Sons, 1905.
 History of the Latin and Teutonic Nations, 1494–1514, George Bell & Sons, 1909.
 The Secret of World History: Selected Writings on the Art and Science of History, Roger Wines, ed., Fordham University Press, 1981.

 Notes 

 References and further reading

 Boldt, Andreas. "Ranke: objectivity and history." Rethinking History 18.4 (2014): 457–474.
 Boldt, Andreas D. The Life and Work of the German Historian Leopold von Ranke (1795–1886): An Assessment of His Achievements (Edwin Mellen Press, 2015). 372pp
 Boldt, Andreas D. Leopold Von Ranke: A Biography (2019)
 Bourne, Edward Gaylord (1896). "Leopold Von Ranke." The Sewanee Review, Vol. 4, No. 4, pp. 385–401.
 Bourne, Edward Gaylord (1901). "Ranke and the Beginning of the Seminary Method in Teaching History." In: Essays in Historical Criticism. New York: Charles Scribner's Sons, pp. 265–274.
 Braw, J. D. "Vision as revision: Ranke and the Beginning of Modern History." History and Theory 46.4 (2007): 45–60.
 Croke, Brian. "How to study the historian Leopold von Ranke (1795–1886)." Teaching History 50.1 (2016): 31–37.
 Cunha, Marcelo Durão Rodrigues da. "The religious roots of modern German historical science: Wilhelm von Humboldt and Leopold von Ranke." Religião & Sociedade 38.2 (2018): 244–276. online
 Dalberg-Acton, John Emerich Edward (1907). "German Schools of History." In: Historical Essays and Studies. London: Macmillan & Co.
 Eskildsen, Kasper Risbjerg. "Leopold Von Ranke (1795–1886): Criticizing an Early Modern Historian." History of Humanities 4.2 (2019): 257–262. online
 Eskildsen, Kasper Risbjerg. "Leopold Ranke's archival turn: location and evidence in modern historiography." Modern Intellectual History 5.3 (2008): 425–453.

 
 Farrenkopf, John (1991). "The Challenge of Spenglerian Pessimism to Ranke and Political Realism," Review of International Studies, Vol. 17, No. 3, pp. 267–284.
 Fitzsimons, M. A. (1980). "Ranke: History as Worship," The Review of Politics, Vol. 42, No. 4, pp. 533–555.
 
 
 Gilbert, Felix (1986). "Leopold von Ranke and the American Philosophical Society," Proceedings of the American Philosophical Society, Vol. 130, No. 3, pp. 362–366.
 Gilbert, Felix (1987). "Historiography: What Ranke Meant," The American Scholar, Vol. 56, No. 3, pp. 393–397.
 
 
 Grafton, Anthony. The Footnote: A Curious History (Harvard UP. 1997) pp 34–93.
 
 Guilland, Antoine (1915). "Leopold von Ranke." In: Modern Germany and her Historians. New York: McBride, Nast & Company, pp. 68–119.
 Iggers, Georg G. The German conception of history: The national tradition of historical thought from Herder to the present (Wesleyan University Press, 2014).
 Iggers, Georg (1962). "The Image of Ranke in American and German Historical Thought," History and Theory, Vol. 2, No. 1, pp. 17–40.
 
 Heying, Lü. "Equal emphasis on "research" and "representation": A new analysis of Ranke's debut work." Chinese Studies in History 53.2 (2020): 122–135. https://doi.org/10.1080/00094633.2020.1720491
 Kinzel, Katherina. "Method and meaning: Ranke and Droysen on the historian's disciplinary ethos." History and Theory 59.1 (2020): 22–41. online

 Krieger, Leonard (1975). "Elements of Early Historicism: Experience, Theory, and History in Ranke," History and Theory, Vol. 14, No. 4, pp. 1–14.
 
 
 Lincoln, John Larkin (1894). "The Historian Leopold von Ranke," In Memorian: John Larkin Lincoln. Boston & New York: Houghton, Mifflin & Company, pp. 568–584.

 Maurer, Kathrin. "The rhetoric of literary realism in Leopold von Ranke's historiography." Clio 35.3 (2006): 309–328.
 Müller, Christian Phillip. "Doing historical research in the early nineteenth century: Leopold Ranke, the archive policy, and the 'relazioni' of the Venetian Republic." Rivista internazionale di storia della storiografia 56 (2009): 81–103.
 
 Price, William (1897). "A Contribution toward a Bibliography of Leopold von Ranke," Annual Report of the American Historical Association, Vol. I, pp. 1265–1274.
 
 Rüsen, Jörn (1990). "Rhetoric and Aesthetics of History: Leopold von Ranke," History and Theory, Vol. 29, No. 2, pp. 190–204.
 Schevill, Ferdinand (1952). "Ranke: Rise, Decline, and Persistence of a Reputation," The Journal of Modern History, 24#3 pp. 219–234. online
 Su, Shih-Chieh. Modern Nationalism and the Making of a Professional Historian: The Life and Work of Leopold von Ranke (Academica Press, 2014).
 
 

 Further reading 
 Williams, H. S. (1907). The historians' history of the world. Volume XV (ed., this volume covers Leopold von Ranke on page 633.)

 External links 

 
 
 Works by Leopold von Ranke at Hathi Trust
 Syracuse University The Leopold von Ranke manuscript collection of Syracuse University : the complete catalogue''
 Works by Leopold von Ranke at Europeana
 Geschichte der romanischen und germanischen Völker von 1494 bis 1514 by Leopold von Ranke at the Internet Archive
 Biography of Ranke, 1901 by William Robinson Clark

1795 births
1886 deaths
People from Wiehe
People from the Electorate of Saxony
19th-century Lutherans
German Lutherans
Lutheran writers
19th-century German writers
19th-century German male writers
German male non-fiction writers
19th-century German historians
German monarchists
German untitled nobility
Leipzig University alumni
Academic staff of the Humboldt University of Berlin
Members of the Royal Netherlands Academy of Arts and Sciences
Corresponding members of the Saint Petersburg Academy of Sciences
Members of the American Philosophical Society
Recipients of the Pour le Mérite (civil class)
Commanders Grand Cross of the Order of the Polar Star